Ayaka Larrison, formerly known as , born  on January 29, 1987, is a Japanese pop singer signed under Universal Music Japan. She had been active in singing for several years before debuting as a solo artist in 2009. Maria plays electric guitar and writes her own lyrics.

Career
Ayaka began her career as a member of Nansho Kids, a sub-group of the famous stage group .  The first noticeable role in her career was her role as young Nala in the Japanese version of the musical The Lion King.

Later in 2002, Ayaka was part of a three-member girlband called SpringS, along with Aya Hirano and Yuuki Yoshida. The unit disbanded in 2003, after releasing one album and four singles. In 2006, she formed the duo 'ltokubo' with Keiko Kubota. Due to a suggestion from Shouko Nakagawa, one of her close friends, in 2007 she went on a music coaching school and finally made her own debut two years later under the name Maria.

In 2012 Ayaka went on hiatus to focus on studying abroad. She came back to Japan in 2014 and continued performing lives as well as musicals. She has since gone by the stage name Ayaka Larrison - her father's family name.

Discography

Solo discography

Albums
 [2010.02.24] – WILL

Singles
 [2009.05.20] – Getaway #63
 [2009.07.15] – Goin' My Way #55
 [2009.10.28] – D.I.T. #27
 [2010.01.27] –  #30

SpringS discography

Albums
[2003.03.26] – Springs Super Best

Singles
[2003.01.22] – DOWN TOWN
[2003.02.26] – 
[2003.03.26] – Raspberry Dream
[2003.09.03] – Identified

Itokubo discography

Singles
[2007.11.21] – Into the sky

External links
Official site
Official blog

Japanese women pop singers
1987 births
Living people
Singers from Tokyo
21st-century Japanese singers
21st-century Japanese women singers